The following lists events that happened during 1986 in Chile.

Incumbents
President of Chile: Augusto Pinochet

Events

February
17 February – Queronque rail accident

November
28 November-8 December – 1986 South American Games

Births
13 January – Francisco Ibáñez Campos
5 February – Sebastián Pinto
11 February – Gabriel Boric
14 May – Gonzalo Novoa
15 May – David Allende
15 May – Matías Fernández
1 July – Leonardo Espinoza
29 July – Guillermo Orellana
4 September – Carlos Andrés Arias

Deaths
31 August – Jorge Alessandri (b. 1896)

References 

 
Years of the 20th century in Chile
Chile